is a Japanese television drama produced by Nippon Television (NTV) in cooperation with Media Mix Japan (MMJ) and broadcast on NTV from October 11, 2006, until December 20 of the same year.

Plot 

Miki Ichinose is a 14-year-old schoolgirl who is very outgoing and cheerful. She lives with her parents and younger brother. She is in a romantic relationship with Satoshi Kirino, who is 15 years old. They keep their relationship a secret from their parents because Miki is young and Satoshi is expected to excel in school and get into a university so he can take over the family business by his overbearing mother.

One night, after a date, they sneak into a treehouse and consummate their relationship. Soon after, Miki suspects that she is pregnant and steals a pregnancy test, which her mother later finds. She is taken to a doctor who confirms her pregnancy.

Miki's parents are very upset, and the doctor tells them that it will be too dangerous for Miki to carry a baby due to her small size. They arrange for her to have an abortion, but Miki is unsure what she should do.

She and Satoshi meet later that night and she gathers the courage to confess her love to him, and he reciprocates. She then tells him that she is pregnant and, although understandably shocked, he takes the news well. However, his mother is furious when she learns of it and forbids the two from seeing each other. Under pressure from his mother, Satoshi tells Miki that an abortion is best. Devastated, she breaks up with him, saying losing his love hurts the most. On the day of the abortion, Miki decides she can't go through with it and runs away from the clinic, with her mother chasing after her. Miki breaks down and tells her mother that she wants to keep the baby. Afterwards, seeing Miki's pain and love for her unborn child, her parents want to support her. Satoshi's mother is furious that Miki has chosen to keep the baby and offers money for an abortion, which the Ichinose family refuses.

Although deciding to focus on her pregnancy and how to give birth to a healthy baby, Miki remains grief-stricken over her breakup with Satoshi, who is also struggling to forget about her and their forthcoming child. To make matters worse, the Kirino family business begins to go bankrupt, which forces Satoshi and his mother to leave and go into hiding to avoid the press. Before they leave, Miki and her mother meet with them. Miki tells Satoshi that she plans to raise the baby with her family's help and won't acknowledge his paternity because she wants him to continue going to school and have a successful future. However, this angers him, leading them to be estranged even more. Miki has to temporarily drop out of school because of her pregnancy and that the teachers believe it will be a bad influence to the other students. A reporter who has been tracking the Kirino family since they went into hiding and suspects that Satoshi is the father of Miki's child, begins to track her. Miki wonders if keeping the baby is the right choice for her due to all the changes that are affecting the lives of her family, friends, and her boyfriend's. Satoshi's mother becomes depressed and attempts suicide to end her misery in debt and humiliation, but he gets her help just in time. Miki's mother visits with them and asks Satoshi to see Miki and the baby one day.

At seven months into the pregnancy, Miki begins to go into premature labor and the reporter, who has been following her, calls for an ambulance. Miki gives birth to a baby girl, that she names Sora, via Caesarean section. Being premature, Sora is placed in the NICU for underdeveloped lungs. Miki's father sees Satoshi on the street and chases after him, and later finds their hiding spot. He pleads for Satoshi to see Miki because she has been longing to see him again and tells him about the baby's condition. Satoshi's mother brushes his pleas off but Satoshi doesn't know what he should do. Miki's father takes him to the hospital to see Sora, and Satoshi is overwhelmed by the sight of his tiny daughter. He later tells his mother that, despite how much he tries to run away and forget, Sora is still his child. Even without his mother's support, Satoshi visits with Miki the day of her discharge to tell her that he has decided to forgot high school to start working and provide for the baby because he wants to take responsibility and raise her with Miki. The two then go with Miki's mother to see the baby and Satoshi learns that Miki named the baby Sora, after the sky which has been symbolic to them. Miki and Satoshi then tell their parents that they hope to get married when they turn 18. Although Miki's parents accept this, Satoshi's mother reluctantly relents but says she will not visit with the baby.

The drama ends with Miki and her family bringing Sora, now healthy and full-term, home and posing for a family picture. Satoshi begins working to help provide for the baby and his mother begins a new business that seems to help bring her out of her depression. Miki begins her new life as a teenage mother.

Cast

Major characters 

 Mirai Shida as 
 Misako Tanaka as 
 Katsuhisa Namase as 
 Kazuki Koshimizu as 
 
 Sayaka Yamaguchi as 
 Junichi Koumoto as 
 Sayaka Kaneko as 
 Haruma Miura as 
 Shigeru Muroi as 
 Mitsuki Tanimura as 
 Kie Kitano as 
 Rina Koike as 
 Yumiko Ideguchi as 
 Kiyo Hasegawa as 
 Itsumi Osawa as 
 Ken Kaito as 
 Shunya Isaka as 
 Atsuko Takahata as 
 Akira Onodera as 
 Kazuki Kitamura as

Minor characters 

 Naho Toda (ep. 8)

Production 

Upon preparing for this role, actress Mirai Shida asked her real-life mother for advice. She wanted to know if there were changes (in walking, appetite, etc.) during pregnancy. Her mother replied, "Except for the belly becoming bigger, nothing else changes." This did not prepare Shida in any way, as stated by herself.

Originally, there were only 10 episodes. Due to the success this drama achieved, an extra episode was made.

Music 

Theme song:
 "Shirushi" by Mr. Children

Soundtrack album:
 Mother at Fourteen O.S.T – TVSANTORA

Episodes 

The average rating for this drama was the highest rating this slot (Wednesday at 10:00 PM) achieved on NTV since 2000. This record was broken by the television series I'm Mita, Your Housekeeper., which garnered an average rating of 25.2%.

References

External links 

  
  

2006 Japanese television series debuts
2006 Japanese television series endings
Japanese drama television series
Nippon TV dramas
Teenage pregnancy in television
Television shows written by Yumiko Inoue